The 2011–12 Romanian Hockey League season was the 82nd season of the Romanian Hockey League. HSC Csíkszereda won the championship by defeating ASC Corona Fenestela Braşov in the league final. The Steaua Rangers finished third by defeating CSM Dunărea Galați in the third place game.

A Moldovan club, Platina Chisinau, initially participated in the first round. They defeated HSC Csíkszereda 9-4 in their first game. They had to forfeit their second game, also against HSC Csíkszereda, due to not having the minimum number of players available to play. A brawl occurred in their third game, a 9-2 win again against HSC Csíkszereda. All players involved were suspended, which forced Platina to forfeit their fourth scheduled game against HSC Csíkszereda, as they did not have enough players available due to the suspensions. After failing to appear for and forfeiting their next two games against CS Progym Gheorgheni, Platina withdrew from the league.

First round

Qualification round

MOL Championship
The three Romanian teams also playing in the MOL Liga were ranked according to the results from games in which they faced each other. HSC Csíkszereda qualified directly for the playoffs as a result of finishing first.

Final round

Playoffs

Semifinals
HSC Csíkszereda - CSM Dunărea Galați 3:0 (13:2, 6:3, 14:0)
ASC Corona Fenestela Brașov - Steaua Rangers 3:2 (8:5, 3:6, 3:1, 3:4 SO, 5:2)

3rd place game
Steaua Rangers - CSM Dunărea Galați 3:1 (10:1, 5:6, 7:2, 10:2)

Final
HSC Csíkszereda - ASC Corona Fenestela Brașov 4:1 (3:4 OT, 6:1, 3:1, 3:0, 3:2)

References

External links
Official website

Romanian Hockey League seasons
Romanian
Rom